"Turn! Turn! Turn!" is the first episode of the fifth season of HBO's television series True Blood and 49th episode overall. It first aired on HBO on June 10, 2012 and written by Brian Buckner and directed by Daniel Minahan. The episode's ratings were naturally good, and so far the episode's ratings are better than all of the other episodes of the season. The season itself is based on The Sookie Stackhouse Novels' fifth book, Dead as a Doornail. The episode picks up with the fourth season's characters and resumes their stories: Sookie and Lafayette's response to Debbie Pelt's attack; Bill and Eric's efforts to evade the Vampire Authority; Alcide's werewolf pack's hounding of Sam in pursuit of their missing leader Marcus. The episode also introduces new characters Nora Gainsborough (played by Lucy Griffiths) and Judge Clements (Conor O'Farrell).

Plot

Sookie and Lafayette
Sookie returns home to find Debbie Pelt aiming a shotgun at her. Tara jumps between them and receives a fatal wound to the head.  Sookie kills Debbie.  Pam appears looking for Eric. Sookie negotiates a deal with Pam: Pam turns Tara into a vampire and Sookie will help Pam repair her relationship with Eric. Pam feeds Tara her blood and the two are placed in the ground and buried.

Lafayette suggests Sookie call the police and claim self-defense. Sookie explains that she had upper hand but chose to kill Debbie. Lafayette helps her clean up the body.

Sookie and Lafayette go to Lafayette's and discover that Jesús's body is gone.

Alcide shows up at Sookie's place and informs her that Russell Edgington is on the loose.  Alcide asks Sookie to live with him for her protection but she declines the offer.

That night, Sookie and Lafayette sit in waiting by Tara's burial spot. Pam emerges from the ground, but is unsure if it worked or not. Sookie digs down to Tara and, finding her motionless, assumes it did not work. She and Lafayette weep. Tara suddenly bursts out of the ground and rushes at Sookie who screams for Lafayette as the episode ends.

Bill and Eric
Bill leaves a voicemail for Jessica (saying he'll be out of town on business) while Eric cleans the blood from his office. They sense that Sookie is in danger.  Eric says "Fuck Sookie" but Bill runs outside and is captured in silver nets, followed by Eric. Vampire Authority agents place them in a car trunk. As the car is underway, Bill and Eric puncture the gas tank and escape by causing the car to explode. One VA agent levels his pistol at them but the second agent kills him. Eric greets her and begins kissing her passionately. He then tells Bill she is his "sister" Nora, as they both were turned by Godric.
Nora, who is a Chancellor, says she's helping Bill and Eric escape from The Authority because of her undying devotion to Eric.  She also informs them that there are factions within the Authority which support them. As they hideout while waiting for transportation, Eric and Nora have sex. His phone rings and she is upset that he still has it, but he tells her it's untraceable. It is Alcide, reporting Russell's disappearance.

Nora takes Bill and Eric to a boat where they are given new identities. But suddenly, everyone except Bill, Eric and Nora are killed and a voice tells them not to move in the name of The Authority as dozens of guards appear and surround them.

Jason
Rev. Steve Newlin appears at Jason's front door. Newlin says he is only there to talk, Jason responds with why doesn’t he go to one of his followers, in which he states they will kill if they saw him like this, Jason still won’t look at him in fear of getting glamoured which Steve says he can’t glamour because his maker released him and ran off, leaving Jason sympathetic towards him  giving him the opportunity to glamour Jason into inviting him in.  Once seated inside, Newlin releases Jason and admits that he's a "Proud Gay American Vampire" and is in love with him. Jason tries to let him down easy, but Newlin angrily threatens him when Jason confesses that "this dog doesn't bark that way". Jessica arrives and declares Jason to be hers. She overpowers Newlin and Jason rescinds his home invitation to Newlin.  Jessica disrobes and mounts Jason, kissing him.

The next day at Merlotte's, Hoyt is sitting at a table with several new friends who call Jason a "girlfriend fucker". Jason approaches the table and tries to talk to "his friend", but Hoyt declares he has no friends at the table.  Hoyt asks him if he did it again, and Jason looks down. Jason apologizes but Hoyt tells him to go away.

That night at the King's mansion, Jessica throws a party with local college students.  
When Jason shows up at the door, she tells him that what she said about being hers was just to protect him.  Jason comes inside and joins the party, reassuring the underage drinkers that he's off-duty. Jason becomes jealous of Jessica when he sees her kissing another guy.  Jason leaves with one of the college girls. In the car Jason tells her that he's not going to have sex with her. He says he'd probably blow her off afterward and that he doesn't want to be a jerk anymore.

Sam and Alcide
Several members of Marcus' wolfpack confront Sam at his place.  They are looking for Marcus but Sam claims to not know his whereabouts. When they threaten to attack, Sam turns into a bird and escapes them. Sam meets up with Luna and Emma, but the pack shows up and to protect them, Sam tells them that he killed Marcus and is taken away.

Sam is tortured but does not give up any information. A woman named Martha shows up and explains the pack's need for Marcus' body. She promises to leave Luna and Emma unharmed if he leads them to the body.

When Sam leads the pack to Marcus' body, Alcide shows up with Luna and he tells them he killed Marcus. While several bow to him as their new pack master, one very vocal wolf says he'll never bend the knee to Alcide. Alcide says he does not want the position. Martha, who is Marcus' mother, changes into a wolf begins eating Marcus' body, other members of the pack join her.

Terry Bellefleur
Terry, Arlene, and family have dinner with Patrick, an old friend of his from the Marines.

Later behind Merlotte's, Patrick tells Terry that he lost his home in a fire in a series of fires afflicting fellow Marines connected to a night from their service in Iraq.

Andy Bellefleur
Wade and Rocky (the former played by Aaron Christian Howles) come home to their hotel room, they find Andy naked in bed with their mother Holly.

Later at Merlotte's, a judge asks Andy to make his son's speeding ticket go away.

Russell Edgington
A man drags another man into a room where he is quickly pulled in and screams while blood splatters across a window.

Title reference
The title is taken from the song of the same name, which was first sung by Pete Seeger and later became a hit for The Byrds. In the episode, the song, as covered by My Morning Jacket is used over the end credits.

Featured Music
The following songs appear in the episode:
"Turn, Turn, Turn" — The Byrds as covered by My Morning Jacket
"Feels Like the First Time" — Foreigner
"Cherry Bomb" (re-recorded version) — The Runaways
"MDV Serenade" — Blee
"The Soul Train's a Comin'" — eBlues Highway
"You're So Mean" — Biff Scarborough
"Silly Love Songs" — Paul McCartney & Wings

Reception

Ratings
True Blood was the number one cable program on the night it aired with 5.201 million viewers, earning a 2.9 rating in the relevant 18-49 demographic (down from a 3.0 for last year's season premiere).

Critical
Reviewer Carrie Raisler of The A.V. Club gave it a B+ and said "[d]espite the abject nature of the final episodes of season four, despite all the stories that held no interest and seemed like a waste of time, I decided to give the show another chance. After seeing the premiere—although I still have reservations—I’m glad I did."

References

External links
 
 "Turn! Turn! Turn!" at HBO.com
 True Blood recap: Season 5 premiere, "Turn! Turn! Turn!" by Jordan Bartel for The Baltimore Sun (9 June 2012)

True Blood episodes
2012 American television episodes